The Socialist Cooperation Party ( Hizb Al-Ta'awun Al-Ishtirakiy) was a political party founded in Damascus, Syria in March 1954; its ideology was Islamist and Socialist.

After the Syrian parliamentary election held in 24 and 25 September 1954, the Socialist Cooperation Party gained 2 seats in the Syrian Parliament.

The party was banned in February 1958 by the President of the United Arab Republic Gamal Abdel Nasser, after the merging between Syria and Egypt, but refounded in 1961 and gained no seats after the Syrian parliamentary election, 1961, the Socialist Cooperation Party was dissolved on 8 March 1963, during and after the Ba'athist revolution.

References

1954 establishments in Syria
1963 establishments in Syria
Banned Islamist parties
Banned socialist parties
Defunct political parties in Syria
Islamic socialist political parties
Islamism in Syria
Political parties disestablished in 1963
Political parties established in 1954
Socialist parties in Syria